Cary Gabriel Costello is an intersex trans male professor and advocate for transgender and intersex rights. His areas of study include identity, sexuality, privilege, and marginalization.

Career and personal life 

Assigned female at birth, Costello first attempted a gender transition in 1991, while working as an attorney in Washington, D.C. Due to the discrimination he experienced, he postponed his transition, and left the legal profession to pursue a degree and career in sociology. He transitioned to male after securing tenure as an associate professor of Sociology at the University of Wisconsin, Milwaukee, where he leads the LGBT Studies program.

Costello has advocated for transgender and intersex people on issues including intersex surgery, eugenics, bathroom bills, TSA airline passenger screening, and the sometimes fraught relationships between intersex and transgender communities. He has analyzed the controversy over the gender testing of South African athlete Caster Semenya from an intersex perspective. Costello has suggested using the term ipso gender instead of cisgender for intersex people who agree with their medically assigned sex.

Costello is the gestational father of a daughter, and is married to an intersex trans woman.

In February 2017, Costello and his wife lost access to transition-related healthcare when the state of Wisconsin reinstated an exclusion on these services. Additionally, his employer required that he obtain and submit new proof of his gender identity, despite the fact that he had transitioned over a decade earlier. A blog post Costello wrote about the situation went viral.

Selected publications

See also 

 Intersex rights in the United States
 Transgender rights in the United States

References

External links 

The Intersex Roadshow
TransFusion

Living people
Intersex men
Transgender men
Transgender writers
Harvard Law School alumni
University of California, Berkeley alumni
University of Wisconsin–Milwaukee faculty
American LGBT rights activists
Intersex rights activists
Intersex rights in the United States
Year of birth missing (living people)
Intersex academics
Intersex writers
Yale College alumni
Transgender academics
21st-century LGBT people